Ulrich II von Graben (before 1300 – ) was a Styrian noble, a member of the edelfrei Von Stein family. He held the titles as Lord of Kornberg and Graben Castle (near Novo Mesto in Lower Carniola), as well as burgrave of Gleichenberg, Rothenfels and Hohenwang.

Life
He was the son of Ulrich I von Graben, burgrave of Gleichenberg, and his wife Gertrud (both died before 1325). His father had entered the service of the Lords of Walsee, a Swabian dynasty with extended properties in the Styrian lands, and from 1302 appeared as a vassal of the Stubenberg family. 

Ulrich II was first mentioned in a 1300 deed, making donations to the Cistercian abbey of Rein in Styria. In 1314 he acquired the village of Wetzelsdorf. After 1325 he succeeded his father as Burgrave of  In 1428, together with his brothers Otto and Frederick, he bought the Lordship (Herrschaft) and Castle of Kornberg with a new family coat of arms. The Kornberg fief remained the ancestral seat of the Styrian branch of the Graben family until the extinction of the line in 1556. Ulrich and his brothers also purchased the villages of Edelsbach and Krottendorf.

From 1343, Ulrich served as burgrave of Rothenfels, an estate then held by the Prince-Bishops of Freising. In 1354 he received the Styrian Burgraviate / Lordship and Castle of Hohenwang from the Habsburg duke Albert II of Austria in pawn.

Ulrich II was married with Barbara, daughter of Johann von Auersperg and Cimburgis Schauerpeck, and later with a Lady called Gertraud (died before 1375). He seemed to have left no children, as his heritage passed to his surviving brother Frederick and his nephew Frederick the Younger.

Notes

Literature
Adalbert Sikora: Die Herren vom Graben in Zeitschrift des historischen Vereines für Steiermark. 51. Jahrgang, Graz 1960

People from Styria
Medieval Austrian nobility
14th-century Austrian people
Year of birth uncertain
Year of death uncertain